Shahjahan Omar (born 24 December 1947) is a Bangladesh Nationalist Party politician and a former state minister for law. He is retired major of the Bangladesh Army and was awarded Bir Uttom. He was a 3-term Jatiya Sangsad member representing the Jhalokati-1 constituency.

Early life
Omar was born on 24 December 1947. He worked as a barrister. After the assassination of Sheikh Mujibur Rahman, he pledged allegiance to the new government led by Bangladesh Army officers.

Career
Omar was elected to the parliament as a candidate of Bangladesh Nationalist Party from Jhalakati-1 in 2001. He served as the State Minister of Law in the Second Khaleda Cabinet. In 2001 his supporters attacked minority Hindu populations in Jhalakati-1 to intimidate them from voting against him.

On 27 October 2007, Anti-Corruption Commission (ACC) sued Omar on corruption charges. On 14 May 2008, he was sentenced  13 years’ imprisonment by a special court in Dhaka. Bangladesh High Court acquitted him in August 2010. In September 2014, Bangladesh Supreme Court allowed ACC to start the process to appeal the High Court verdict.

Personal life
Omar is married to Mehjabin Farzana Omar, and they have a son, Adnan Omar.

References

Living people
1947 births
People from Jhalokati district
Bangladesh Army officers
Recipients of the Bir Uttom
Bangladesh Nationalist Party politicians
5th Jatiya Sangsad members
6th Jatiya Sangsad members
8th Jatiya Sangsad members
State Ministers of Law, Justice and Parliamentary Affairs
20th-century Bengalis
21st-century Bengalis
Mukti Bahini personnel